The European Survey Research Association (ESRA) was founded in 2005 to provide coordination in the field of Survey Research in Europe. According to the website, ESRA's main goal is to encourage communication between methodologists and researchers in substantive fields such as sociology, psychology, political science, and other disciplines employing survey data. Its main two activities are the biannual conferences on survey research, and the open access journal Survey Research Methods (SRM).

Established in January 2007, Survey Research Methods (SRM) is the official journal of the European Survey Research Association.  This young peer-reviewed journal aims to be a high quality scientific publication that will be of interest to researchers in all disciplines involved in the design, implementation and analysis of statistical surveys. The journal is published electronically with free and open access via the internet. The first issue was published 31 January 2007, and contained articles dealing with topics such as survey nonresponse, the measurement of social capital, the quality of survey questions, and cross-cultural research. The current editors of SRM are Jaak Billiet of the Catholic University in Leuven, Belgium, and Ulrich Kohler of the University of Potsdam, Germany.

External links
 Survey Research Methods (SRM) journal

Research and development in Europe
Social research
Social sciences organizations
Statistical societies